Elathur is a panchayat town in Gobichettipalayam taluk of Erode district  in the state of Tamil Nadu, India.

Demographics
 India census, Elathur had a population of 4386: males constitute 50% of the population and females 50%. Elathur has an average literacy rate of 46%, lower than the national average of 59.5%: male literacy is 58%, and female literacy is 35%. In Elathur, 9% of the population is under 6 years of age.

References

Cities and towns in Erode district